Marcel Stenzel (born 17 February 1992) is a German football player. He plays currently for Hamborn 07.

Career
He made his professional debut for MSV Duisburg in the 3. Liga on 21 March 2015 in a 4–1 away victory against Borussia Dortmund II.

References

1992 births
Living people
Footballers from Dortmund
German footballers
Association football midfielders
MSV Duisburg players
3. Liga players
Rot-Weiß Oberhausen players